Robbie Ventura (born May 5, 1971) is an American former professional racing cyclist.

Career

Early career
Robbie graduated with honors from Lake Forest College with a double major in Business and Psychology. While working toward his bachelor's degree, he played on the Forester hockey team, which advanced to the NCAA Tournament, and was named to the All-American Collegiate Cycling Team. In 2008, he was inducted into the LFC Athletic Hall of Fame for his accomplishments in both hockey and cycling.

Racing career
Robbie Ventura raced professionally for 12 years, including 3 years in the United States Postal Service Cycling Team.  Ventura accumulated over 70 wins.

References

Living people
American male cyclists
Lake Forest College alumni
Sportspeople from Kenosha, Wisconsin
1971 births